Marcos Zapata (c. 1710–1773), also called Marcos Sapaca Inca, was a Peruvian painter, born in Cuzco. He was one of the last members of the Cuzco School, an art center in which Spanish painters taught native students to paint religious works. Zapata introduced elements from his own lands into his paintings. For instance, his 1753 rendering of the Last Supper shows Jesus and his disciples gathering around a table laid with guinea pig and glasses of chicha.

Between 1748 and 1764, Zapata painted at least 200 works. 24 of them portrayed the life of Saint Francis of Assisi for the Order of Friars Minor Capuchin of Santiago, Chile. He painted 50 linen cloths with the Laurentina Litany for the Cathedral of Santo Domingo, Cusco. Red and blue were prominent colors in his palette.

His influential style developed between 1748 and 1773. He is known for his beautiful portraits of the Virgin Mary, almost always surrounded by cherubim. Zapata incorporated allegorical subjects in his Madonnas. Christoph Thomas Scheffler wrote in 1732, that the painter was inspired by prints of the subject. His compositions are didactic, with a relatively simple reading of complex theological concepts.

By order of the Jesuits, Zapata created another similar series of painting, assisted by his apprentice, Cipriano Gutiérrez. These included an enthroned Virgin, which Zapata finished in 1764 for the Parish of the Almudena. His majestic representation enjoyed enormous acceptance, judging by the large numbers of copies and variants that circulated in throughout the region. The fame of Zapata widely extended the limits of Cuzco, and its sphere of influence extended through Peru, Chile, and northern Argentina. The art of this teacher was continued in later decades by several of his followers, including Antonio Vilca and Ignacio Chacón.

References

Peruvian Mannerist painters
1773 deaths
Latin American artists of indigenous descent
Peruvian people of Quechua descent
Cusco School
18th-century indigenous painters of the Americas
Year of birth unknown
18th-century Peruvian people
Year of birth uncertain
18th-century Peruvian artists